Sir Moore Crosthwaite  (13 August 1907 – 27 April 1989) was a British diplomat, ambassador to Lebanon and Sweden.

Career
Ponsonby Moore Crosthwaite was educated at Rugby School and Corpus Christi College, Oxford. He held a Laming Fellowship at The Queen's College, Oxford, in 1931 and joined the Diplomatic Service in 1932. He served at Baghdad, Moscow, Madrid and Athens before being appointed Deputy UK Representative to the United Nations in New York 1952–58, Ambassador to Lebanon 1958–63 and Ambassador to Sweden 1963–66.

Honours
Moore Crosthwaite was appointed CMG in the New Year Honours of 1951 and knighted KCMG in the New Year Honours of 1960.

References
CROSTHWAITE, Sir (Ponsonby) Moore, Who Was Who, A & C Black, 1920–2008; online edn, Oxford University Press, Dec 2012

1907 births
1989 deaths
People educated at Rugby School
Alumni of Corpus Christi College, Oxford
Fellows of The Queen's College, Oxford
Ambassadors of the United Kingdom to Lebanon
Ambassadors of the United Kingdom to Sweden
Knights Commander of the Order of St Michael and St George